Mountain View School District is located in Ontario, California.

Schools
The district operates five schools:
Creek View Elementary School 3742 Lytle Creek North Loop, Ontario, California
Mountain View Elementary School 2825 Walnut Street, Ontario, California
Ranch View Elementary School 3300 Old Archibald Ranch Road, Ontario, California
Grace Yokley Jr High School 2947 South Turner Avenue, Ontario, California
Park View Elementary School
4860 S Celebration Avenue, Ontario, California

References

External links
 

School districts in San Bernardino County, California